Haunted Summer is a 1988 drama film directed by Ivan Passer.

Plot summary 
In 1816, authors Lord Byron, Percy Shelley, and Mary Shelley (née Godwin) get together for some philosophical discussions, but the situation soon deteriorates into mind games, drugs, and sex. It is a fictionalization of the summer that Lord Byron and the Shelleys, together with Byron's doctor, John William Polidori, spent in the isolated Villa Diodati by Lake Geneva. It is there they devise a contest to produce the best horror story to kill the dullness of summer. It is also there that one of the world's most famous books was given life—Mary Shelley's Frankenstein.

Cast 
 Philip Anglim as Lord Byron
 Eric Stoltz as Percy Shelley
 Alice Krige as Mary Wollstonecraft Godwin
 Alex Winter as Dr. John William Polidori
 Laura Dern as Claire Clairmont

See also
Other films about this meeting of authors include the following:
 Gothic (1986 film)
 Rowing with the Wind (1988 film)
 Mary Shelley (2017 film)

External links
 
 

1988 films
1988 drama films
Films scored by Christopher Young
Films with screenplays by Lewis John Carlino
Golan-Globus films
Films set in 1816
Films set in Switzerland
Cultural depictions of Lord Byron
Cultural depictions of John Polidori
Cultural depictions of Mary Shelley
Cultural depictions of Percy Bysshe Shelley
Films directed by Ivan Passer
1980s English-language films
English-language drama films